"Flame" is the only album recorded by the duo of singer/lyricist Tim Bowness (No-Man) and keyboard player Richard Barbieri (Porcupine Tree), released in 1994.

The two men met when Tim Bowness and Steven Wilson (also of Porcupine Tree) invited Richard Barbieri (along with Mick Karn and Steve Jansen) to join the live line-up of Bowness and Wilsons's band No-Man. Apart from Wilson, Karn and Jansen, "Flame" also features appearances by drummers Chris Maitland and Gavin Harrison (formerly and currently of Porcupine Tree respectively). Also appearing is guitarist Michael Bearpark, from Bowness's Samuel Smiles band.

The title track of the album is a reworked version (with lyrics and vocal melody written by Bowness) of a Barbieri-penned instrumental called "Long Tales, Tall Shadows", which appeared on the Jansen and Barbieri 1991 album Stories Across Borders. In the same vein, "Song of Love and Everything" heavily draws from "Lumen", another song from that same album that was written by Jansen and Barbieri. 

Portions of the recording sessions ran parallel to those of No-Man's Flowermouth album (released two months previously, also on One Little Indian). Wire Magazine, in conjunction with the label, distributed a four-track sampler CD with their July 1994 issue which included two tracks from each release.

Track listing

Song credits 

A Night In Heaven (Barbieri/Bowness)
Steve Jansen - drum programming
Mick Karn - saxophone
Richard Barbieri - keyboards, synthesisers, additional drum programming
Tim Bowness - vocal

Song Of Love And Everything (part I & II) (Jansen/Barbieri/Bowness)
Steve Jansen - drum programming, guitar, hand percussion, bass synthetiser
Mick Karn - bass guitar
Steven Wilson - guitar
Richard Barbieri - keyboards, synthesisers
Tim Bowness - vocal

Brightest Blue (Bowness)
Chris Maitland - drum kit
Danny Thompson - acoustic bass
Michael Bearpark - guitar
Richard Barbieri - keyboards, synthesisers
Tim Bowness - vocal

Flame (Barbieri/Bowness)
Gavin Harrison - drum kit
Steve Jansen - drum programming
Mick Karn - bass guitar
Steven Wilson - guitar
Richard Barbieri - keyboards, synthesisers
Tim Bowness - vocal

Trash Talk (Jansen/Barbieri/Bowness)
Steve Jansen - drum programming
Richard Barbieri - keyboards, synthesisers
Tim Bowness - vocal

Time Flown (Barbieri/Bowness)
Gavin Harrison - drum programming
Mick Karn - saxophone
Richard Barbieri - keyboards, synthesisers
Tim Bowness - vocal

Torch Dance (Barbieri)
Steve Jansen - drum programming
Michael Bearpark - guitars
Richard Barbieri - keyboards, drum programming, treatments

Feel (Barbieri/Bowness)
Steve Jansen - drum programming, bass synthesisers
Michael Bearpark - guitar
Richard Barbieri - keyboards, synthesisers
Tim Bowness - vocal

References

1994 albums
Tim Bowness albums